The chapter of Dragon Eye are written and illustrated by Kairi Fujiyama. The manga was serialized in Kodansha's manga magazine, Monthly Shōnen Sirius. Kodansha published the manga's 9 tankōbon between December 22, 2005, and February 22, 2008. The manga is licensed in North America by Del Rey Manga, which released the first volume in June 2007. The eighth volumes has been published with the seventh volume released in March 2009.



Volume list

References

Dragon Eye